The Qatar National Company for Medical Projects (شركة قطر الوطنية للمشاريع الطبية) is a private Qatari shareholding company established in 2005. According to the company’s statute, the Qatar National Company for Medical Projects’s main purpose is to contribute to Qatar’s healthcare system and economy by investing in the fields of healthcare and medical industry.

When the company was established by the Qatari Minister of Economy and Trade (decision n.63/2005), the company had 160 million riyals in capital.

Financial information 
The company is publicly traded on the Abu Dhabi Securities Exchange under the ticker symbol GMPC.

On July 3, 2015, the company announced that its net profit had increased by 20 percent for the first half of 2015 compared to the same period the previous year.

Mission 
The establishment of the company was publicly announced at the Intercontinental Hotel in Doha in March 2005.
In his inaugural address, Sheikh Abdul Rahman bin Khalifa bin Abdul Aziz al-Thani, chairman of the board of directors, emphasized that the company aims to “be a pioneer in the field of medical industry at the highest level” and to contribute to an inclusive healthcare system which may benefit all segments of the Qatari society.

The company intends to provide high-quality medical services ranging from health insurance coverage to medical assistance, and including support to medical research.

Article 3 of Qatar National Company for Medical Projects’ charter defines the primary goal of the company as the establishment and management of hospitals and medical clinics, as well as of diagnosis centers. The company also provides and manages infrastructural, medical and pharmaceutical equipment and supplies. Moreover, according to the same article, the company engages and supports other firms with analogous or subsidiary purposes in Qatar or abroad.

Under Article 4 of its statute, the company is committed to provide medical services in compliance with the Islamic law.

Board of directors 
According to Article 28 of the company’s statute, the company is managed by a board of five elected members. The first board of directors was by the company’s founders:
Sheikh Abdul Rahman bin Khalifa bin Abdul Aziz al-Thani, chairman of the board of directors;
Sheikh Ahmed bin Eid bin Mohammed al-Thani, deputy chairman;
Sheikh Mishaal bin Abdullah bin Jassim al-Thani, member;
Mohammed Sultan Ali Abdullah al-Ali, member;
Bader Abdul Rahim Yusuf, member.

References

External links
 Corporate filings and disclosures at Zawya.com

Health care companies of Qatar
2005 establishments in Qatar